This page describes the final meetings of the 2010 Individual Long Track World Championship.

The 2010 FIM Long Track World Championship final meeting took place from May 30 to September 18, 2010. There were six final meetings with seventeen permanent riders and one wild card and two track reserves.

Heat details

Final One 
30 May 2010
 Pfarrkirchen, Bavaria
Rennbahn Pfarrkirchen (Length: 1,000 m)
Referee:  Pavel Vana
Jury President:  Armando Castagna
References

Final Two 
12 June 2010
 Saint-Macaire, Gironde
Piste Michel Paris (Length: 506 m)
Referee:  Istvan Darago
Jury President:  Wolfgang Glas
References

Final Three 
13 July 2010
 Marmande, Lot-et-Garonne
Track of Carpète (Piste de Carpète) (Length: 504.60 m)
Referee:  Franck Ziegler
Jury President:  Boris Kotnjek
References

Final Four 
22 August 2010
 Eenrum, Groningen
Sportpark Eenrum (Length: 625 m)
Referee:  Wojciech Grodzki
Jury President:  Janos Nadasdi
References 
Change:
Draw 6. Gerd Riss → Jérôme Lespinase

Final Five 
11 September 2010
 Vechta, Lower Saxony
Reiterwaldstadion (Length: 535 m)
Referee:  Pavel Vana
Jury President:  Christian Bouin
References  
Changes:
Draw 11. Gerd Riss → Jérôme Lespinase
Draw 13. Stephane Tresarrieu → Mark Stiekema

Final Six 
19 September 2010
 Marianske Laszne
Stadium of Lokomotiva Mariánské Lázně (Length: 1,000 m)
Referee:  Christian Froschauer
Jury President:  Jörgen L. Jensen
References  
Changes:
Draw 5. Gerd Riss → Jérôme Lespinase
Draw 14. Stephane Tresarrieu → Vladimir Trofimov

See also 
 2010 Speedway Grand Prix
 2010 Team Long Track World Championship

References